Brown Hotel or Brown's Hotel or The Brown Hotel may refer to:

in the United Kingdom
 Brown's Hotel, in London
 Brown's Hotel (Laugharne), in Carmarthenshire, Wales

in the United States
 Brown Hotel (Neodesha, Kansas)
 Brown Hotel (Louisville, Kentucky)
 Brown's Hotel (Catskills), in New York
 Hotel Brown, in Flasher, North Dakota